Ferungulata ("wild beasts and ungulates") is a grandorder of placental mammals that groups together mirorder Ferae and clade Pan-Euungulata. It has existed in two guises, a traditional one based on morphological analysis and a revised one taking into account more recent molecular analyses. The Fereungulata is a sister group to the order Chiroptera (bats) and together they make clade Scrotifera.

Characteristics
According to 2022 study of Anne E. Kort, member of grandorder Ferungulata, in addition to their genetic similarities, share common synapomorphy in the lumbar vertebrae (the S-shaped postzygapophysis). In extant ferungulate mammals, this is known only within members of order Artiodactyla. However, this feature is found also in many extinct members of Ferungulata, including hyaenodonts, oxyaenids, mesonychids, arctocyonids and the stem-relatives of perissodactyls. This synapomorphy suggests that this may be basal to all Ferungulata and secondarily lost in modern members, like carnivorans and crown Perissodactyla. Previous study has shown that these S-shaped zygapophyses prevent torsion between vertebrae. As said in this study, it is possible this feature evolved in response to a need for stabilization in posterior spine as ribs became reduced. Also, in this and several other 2022 studies the extinct eutherians pantodonts, tillodonts and genus Deltatherium (family Deltatheriidae) are recognised as crown-group placental mammals and members of Ferungulata, who also possess S-shaped postzygapophysis.

Classification and phylogeny

History of phylogeny
The traditional Ferungulata was established by George Gaylord Simpson in 1945. It grouped together the extant orders Carnivora, Perissodactyla and Artiodactyla with the Tubulidentata and the superorder Paenungulata, as well as a number of orders known only from fossils.

Simpson established the grouping on the basis of morphological criteria, but this traditional understanding of Ferungulata has been challenged by a more recent classification, relying upon genetic criteria. These studies separated his ungulate orders into two distinct placental groups, within Afrotheria and Laurasiatheria, respectively. The 'true' ungulates (mirorder Euungulata), Perissodactyla and Artiodactyla, are included in the revised group, along with the Carnivora, and with the addition of pangolins (order Pholidota), but the Tubulidentata and paenungulates are excluded. Although Simpson placed whales (Cetacea) in a separate cohort, recent evidence linking them to Artiodactyla would mean that they belong here as well. To reflect this difference, the revised clade is usually referred to as Fereungulata.

Taxonomy
{|
! Traditional classification: !! Revised classification:
|- style="vertical-align:top;"
|
 Cohort: Ferungulata 
 Superorder: Ferae 
 Order: Carnivora  (carnivorans)
 Clade: Ungulata  (ungulates)
 Superorder: Mesaxonia 
 Order: Perissodactyla  (odd-toed ungulates)
 Superorder: Paenungulata 
 Order: Hyracoidea  (hyraxes)
 Order: Proboscidea  (proboscideans)
 Order: Sirenia  (sea-cows)
 Order: †Dinocerata 
 Order: †Embrithopoda 
 Order: †Pantodonta 
 Order: †Pyrotheria 
 Superorder: Paraxonia 
 Order: Artiodactyla  (even-toed ungulates)
 Superorder: Protungulata 
 Order: Tubulidentata 
 Order: †Astrapotheria 
 Order: †Condylarthra 
 Order: †Litopterna 
 Order: †Notoungulata 
|
 Grandorder: Ferungulata 
 Mirorder: Ferae 
 Clade: Pan-Carnivora 
 Clade: Pholidotamorpha 
 Clade: Pan-Euungulata 
 Mirorder: Euungulata  (true ungulates)
 Family: †Protungulatidae 
 Order: †Pantodonta 
 Order: †Tillodontia 
 Family: †Deltatheriidae 

 ichnotaxa of Ferungulata:
 Ichnogenus: †Palimmecopus 
|}

Phylogeny
The phylogenetic relationships of grandorder Ferungulata are shown in the following cladogram, reconstructed from mitochondrial and nuclear DNA and protein characters, as well as the fossil record.

See also
 Mammal classification
 Scrotifera

References

 
Mammal taxonomy